The Intelligent Transportation Society of America (ITS America) is a Washington, D.C. based membership and advocacy group for the development and deployment of Intelligent Transportation Systems (ITS) in the United States. ITS America was established in 1991 as a not-for-profit organization with the intention to foster the use of advanced technologies in surface transportation systems.  In late 2017, Shailen Bhatt was named as the CEO of ITS America and served in that post until 2021.

ITS America membership is composed of state and city public agencies, private companies, research institutions, academia and includes automakers, telecommunications, traditional IT, emerging technology, consumer apps, industrial electronics, road, transit as well as other transportation infrastructure operators and the research community

The organization is one of the participants and hosts of the 2017 World Congress on Intelligent Transport Systems will be hosted in 2022 by ITS World Congress in Los Angeles, California. Past ITS America Annual Meetings were held in Detroit, Michigan, Washington, D.C. The 2020 ITS World Congress was cancelled due to the COVID-19 pandemic. The 2021 ITS America Annual Meeting was held in Charlotte, North Carolina.

See also 
 Internet of Things
 List of ITS associations

References

External links 
 
 

Non-profit organizations based in Washington, D.C.
Organizations established in 1991
1991 establishments in the United States